The Nagaland women's cricket team is a women's cricket team that represents the Indian state of Nagaland. They were formed ahead of the 2018–19 season, and compete in the Women's Senior One Day Trophy and the Senior Women's T20 League.

History
Nagaland Women were formed ahead of the 2018–19 season, after an expansion of teams in Indian domestic cricket. In their first season, they competed in the Senior Women's One Day League, where they finished 4th in the Plate Competition with 5 wins, and in the Senior Women's T20 League, where they finished bottom of their group.

The following season, 2019–20, Nagaland finished 2nd in the Plate Competition of the Senior Women's One Day League, therefore gaining promotion. However, they again finished bottom of their Senior Women's T20 League group. The following season, 2020–21, with only the One Day League going ahead, Nagaland finished bottom of the Elite Competition Group D, losing all five of their matches, therefore being relegated to the Plate Group. In 2021–22, they finished second in the Plate Group of the One Day Trophy, whilst they won the Plate Group of the T20 Trophy, therefore progressing to the knockout stages. They lost their first knockout match, by 7 wickets to Kerala. Nagaland batter Kiran Navgire was the leading run-scorer in the competition, with 525 runs including scoring 162* in the opening round of the tournament. In 2022–23, Nagaland won two matches in each of the two competitions.

Players

Notable players
Players who have played for Nagaland and played internationally are listed below, in order of first international appearance (given in brackets):

 Karu Jain (2004)
 Kiran Navgire (2022)

Seasons

Women's Senior One Day Trophy

Senior Women's T20 League

See also
 Nagaland cricket team

References

Women's cricket teams in India
Cricket in Nagaland
Cricket clubs established in 2018
2018 establishments in Nagaland